The maritime republics, also called merchant republics, were thalassocratic city-states of the Mediterranean Basin during the Middle Ages. Being a significant presence in Italy in the Middle Ages, four of them have the coat of arms inserted in the flag of the Italian Navy since 1947: Venice, Genoa, Pisa, and Amalfi; the other republics are: Ragusa (now Dubrovnik), Gaeta, Ancona, and the little Noli.

From the 10th century, they built fleets of ships both for their own protection and to support extensive trade networks across the Mediterranean, giving them an essential role in reestablishing contacts between Europe, Asia, and Africa, which had been interrupted during the early Middle Ages. These contacts were not only commercial, but also cultural and artistic. They also had an essential role in the Crusades.

Origins

The expression "maritime republics" refers to the Italian city-states which, since the Middle Ages, enjoyed political autonomy and economic prosperity, thanks to their maritime activities. The economic growth of Europe around the year 1000, together with the hazards of the mainland trading routes, made possible the development of major commercial routes along the Mediterranean coast. The growing independence acquired by some coastal cities gave them a leading role in this development. These cities, exposed to pirate raids (mostly Saracen), organized their own defence, providing themselves substantial war fleets. Thus, in the 10th and 11th centuries they were able to switch to an offensive stance, taking advantage of the rivalry between the Byzantine and Islamic maritime powers and competing with them for control over commerce and trade routes to Asia and Africa.

They were generally republics and formally independent, though most of them originated from territories once formally belonging to the Byzantine Empire (the main exceptions being Genoa and Pisa). During the time of their independence, all these cities had similar (though not identical) systems of government, in which the merchant class had considerable power.

Amalfi, Ancona, Gaeta, Genoa, Venice and Ragusa began their own history of autonomy and trading after being almost destroyed by a terrible looting, or were founded by refugees from devastated lands.

The maritime republics became heavily involved in the Levantine Crusades of the 10th to 13th centuries. They provided transport and support to Crusaders, and especially took advantage of the political and trading opportunities created by the conflict. The Fourth Crusade of 1202–1204, originally intended to recapture Jerusalem, ultimately resulted in the Venetian conquest of Zara and Constantinople.

Venice, Genoa and Pisa became regional states: they had dominion over vast lands of their region and over different overseas lands, including many Mediterranean islands (especially Sardinia and Corsica), lands on the Adriatic, Aegean, and Black Sea (Crimea); Venice stands out from the rest in that it maintained enormous tracts of land in Greece, Cyprus, Istria, and Dalmatia until as late as the mid-17th century. Amalfi, Ancona, Gaeta and Ragusa instead extended their domain only to a part of the territory of their region, configuring themselves as a city-state throughout the period of their history. All maritime republics, had commercial colonies in the Near East and in North Africa; an exception is Noli, who used the Genoese ones.

The maritime republics over the centuries

Development

The history of the various maritime republics is quite varied, reflecting their different lifespans. Venice, Genoa, Noli, and Ragusa had very long lives, with an independence that outlasted the medieval period and continued up to the threshold of the contemporary era, when the Italian and European states were devastated by the Napoleonic Wars. Other republics kept their independence until the Renaissance: Pisa came under the dominion of the Republic of Florence in 1406, and Ancona came under control of the Papal States in 1532. Amalfi and Gaeta, though, lost their independence very soon: the first in 1131 and the second in 1140, both having passed into the hands of the Normans.

The maritime republics formed autonomous republican governments, an expression of the merchant class that constituted the backbone of their power. The history of the maritime republics intertwines both with the launch of European expansion to the East and with the origins of modern capitalism as a mercantile and financial system. Using gold coins, the merchants of the Italian maritime republics began to develop new foreign exchange transactions and accounting. Technological advances in navigation provided essential support for the growth of mercantile wealth. Nautical charts of the fourteenth and fifteenth centuries all belong to the schools of Genoa, Venice and Ancona.

The Crusades offered opportunities for expansion. They increasingly relied on Italian sea transport, for which the republics extracted concessions of colonies as well as a cash price. Venice, Amalfi, Ancona, and Ragusa were already engaged in trade with the Levant, but the phenomenon increased with the Crusades: thousands of Italians from the maritime republics poured into the Eastern Mediterranean and the Black Sea, creating bases, ports and commercial establishments known as "colonies". These were small gated enclaves within a city, often just a single street, where the laws of the Italian city were administered by a governor appointed from home, and there would be a church under home jurisdiction and shops with Italian styles of food. These Italian mercantile centers also exerted significant political influence locally: the Italian merchants formed guild-like associations in their business centers, aiming to obtain legal, tax and customs privileges from foreign governments. Several personal dominions arose. Pera in Constantinople, first Genoese and later (under the Ottomans) Venetian, was the largest and best known Italian trading base.

Amalfi

Amalfi, perhaps the first of the maritime republics to play a major role, had developed extensive trade with Byzantium and Egypt. Amalfitan merchants wrested the Mediterranean trade monopoly from the Arabs and founded mercantile bases in Southern Italy and the Middle East in the 10th century. Amalfitans were the first to create a colony in Constantinople.

Among the most important products of the Republic of Amalfi are the Amalfian Laws, a codification of the rules of maritime law which remained in force throughout the Middle Ages.

From 1039 Amalfi came under the control of the Principality of Salerno. In 1073 Robert Guiscard conquered the city, taking the title Dux Amalfitanorum ("Duke of the Amalfitans"). In 1096 Amalfi revolted and reverted to an independent republic, but this was put down in 1101. It revolted again in 1130 and was finally subdued in 1131.

Amalfi was sacked by Pisans in 1137, at a time when it was weakened by natural disasters (severe flooding) and was annexed to the Norman lands in southern Italy. Thereafter, Amalfi began a rapid decline and was replaced in its role as the main commercial hub of Campania by the Duchy of Naples.

Pisa

In 1016 an alliance of Pisa and Genoa defeated the Saracens, conquered Corsica and gained control of the Tyrrhenian Sea. A century later they freed the Balearic Islands in an expedition that was celebrated in the Gesta triumphalia per Pisanos and in the Liber Maiorichinus epic poem, composed in 1113–1115.

Pisa, at that time overlooking the sea at the mouth of the Arno, reached the pinnacle of its glory between the 12th and 13th centuries, when its ships controlled the Western Mediterranean. Rivalry between Pisa and Genoa grew worse in the 12th century and resulted in the naval Battle of Meloria (1284), which marked the beginning of Pisan decline; Pisa renounced all claim to Corsica and ceded part of Sardinia to Genoa in 1299. Moreover, the Aragonese conquest of Sardinia, which began in 1324, deprived the Tuscan city of dominion over the Giudicati of Cagliari and Gallura. Pisa maintained its independence and control of the Tuscan coast until 1409, when it was annexed by Florence.

Genoa

Genoa, also known as La Superba ("the Superb one"), began to gain autonomy from the Holy Roman Empire around the 11th century, becoming a city-state with a republican constitution, and participating in the First Crusade. Initially called Compagna Communis, the denomination of republic was made official in 1528 on the initiative of Admiral Andrea Doria.

The alliance with Pisa allowed the liberation of the western sector of the Mediterranean from Saracen pirates, with the reconquest of Corsica, the Balearics and Provence.

The formation of the Compagna Communis, a meeting of all the city's trade associations (compagnie), also comprising the noble lords of the surrounding valleys and coasts, finally signaled the birth of Genoese government.

The fortunes of the town increased considerably when it joined the First Crusade: its participation brought great privileges for the Genoese colonists, which moved to many places in the Holy Land. The apex of Genoese fortune came in the 13th century with the conclusion of the Treaty of Nymphaeum (1261) with the Byzantine emperor Michael VIII Palaeologus. In exchange for aiding the Byzantine reconquest of Constantinople, this led to the ousting of the Venetians from the straits leading to the Black Sea, which quickly became a Genoese sea. Shortly afterwards, in 1284, Pisa was finally defeated in the Battle of Meloria by the Genoese Navy.

In 1298 the Genoese defeated the Venetian fleet at the Dalmatian island of Curzola. The confrontation led to the capture of the Venetian Admiral and Marco Polo, who during his imprisonment at the Palazzo San Giorgio dictated the story of his travels to Rustichello da Pisa, his cellmate. Genoa remained relatively powerful until the last major conflict with Venice, the War of Chioggia of 1379. It ended in victory for the Venetians, who finally regained dominance over trade to the East.

After a gloomy 15th century marked by plagues and foreign domination, the city regained self-government in 1528 through the efforts of Andrea Doria, who created a new constitution for Genoa. Throughout the following century Genoa became the primary sponsor of the Spanish monarchy, reaping huge profits, which allowed the old patrician class to remain vital for a period. The Republic remained independent until 1797, when it was conquered by the French First Republic under Napoleon and replaced with the Ligurian Republic. After a brief revival in 1814, the Republic was ultimately annexed by the Kingdom of Sardinia in 1815.

Venice

The Republic of Venice, also known as La Serenissima (The Most Serene), came into being in 727 AD as a result of the development of trade relations with the Byzantine Empire, of which it was once formally a part, albeit with a substantial degree of independence. Venice remained an ally of Byzantium in the fight against Arabs and Normans. Around 1000 it began its expansion in the Adriatic, defeating the pirates who occupied the coast of Istria and Dalmatia and placing those regions and their principal townships under Venetian control. At the beginning of the 13th century, the city reached the peak of its power, dominating the commercial traffic in the Mediterranean and with the Orient. During the Fourth Crusade (1202–1204) its fleet was decisive in the acquisition of the islands and the most commercially important seaside towns of the Byzantine Empire. The conquest of the important ports of Corfu (1207) and Crete (1209) gave it a trade that extended to the east and reached Syria and Egypt, endpoints of maritime trading routes. By the end of the 14th century, Venice had become one of the richest states in Europe. Its dominance in the eastern Mediterranean in later centuries was threatened by the expansion of the Ottoman Empire in those areas, despite the great naval victory in the Battle of Lepanto in 1571 against the Turkish fleet, fought with the Holy League.

The Republic of Venice expanded strongly on the mainland, too. It became the largest of the maritime republics and was the most powerful state of Italy until 1797, when Napoleon invaded the Venetian lagoon and conquered Venice. The city passed between French and Austrian control over the next half-century, before briefly regaining its independence during the revolutions of 1848. Austrian rule resumed a year later, and continued until 1866, when Veneto passed into the Kingdom of Italy.

Ancona

Included in the Papal States since 774, Ancona came under the influence of the Holy Roman Empire around 1000, but gradually gained independence to become fully independent with the coming of the communes in the 12th century. Although somewhat confined by Venetian supremacy on the sea, Ancona was a notable maritime republic for its economic development and its preferential trade, particularly with the Byzantine Empire. Despite a series of expeditions, trade wars and naval blockades, Venice never succeeded in subduing Ancona.

The republic of Ancona enjoyed excellent relations with the Kingdom of Hungary and was an ally of the Republic of Ragusa. Despite the link with Byzantium, it also maintained good relations with the Turks, enabling it to serve as central Italy's gateway to the Orient. The warehouses of the Republic of Ancona were continuously active in Constantinople, Alexandria and other Byzantine ports, while the sorting of goods imported by land (especially textiles and spices) fell to the merchants of Lucca and Florence.

In art, Ancona was one of the centers of so-called Adriatic Renaissance, that particular kind of renaissance that spread between Dalmatia, Venice and the Marches, characterized by a rediscovery of classical art and a certain continuity with Gothic art. The maritime cartographer Grazioso Benincasa was born in Ancona, as was the navigator-archaeologist Cyriacus of Ancona, named by his fellow humanists "father of the antiquities", who made his contemporaries aware of the existence of the Parthenon, the Pyramids, the Sphinx and other famous ancient monuments believed destroyed.

Ancona always had to guard itself against the designs of both the Holy Roman Empire and the papacy. It never attacked other maritime cities, but was always forced to defend itself. It succeeded until 1532, when it lost its independence after Pope Clement VII took possession of it by political means.

Ragusa

In the first half of the 7th century, Ragusa began to develop an active trade in the East Mediterranean. From the 11th century, it emerged as a maritime and mercantile city, especially in the Adriatic. The first known commercial contract goes back to 1148 and was signed with the city of Molfetta, but other cities came along in the following decades, including Pisa, Termoli and Naples.

After the fall of Constantinople in 1204, during the Fourth Crusade, Ragusa came under the dominion of the Republic of Venice, from which it inherited most of its institutions. Venetian rule lasted for one and a half centuries and determined the institutional structure of the future republic, with the emergence of the Senate in 1252 and the approval of the Ragusa Statute on 9 May 1272. In 1358, following a war with the Kingdom of Hungary, the Treaty of Zadar forced Venice to give up many of its possessions in Dalmatia. Ragusa voluntarily became a dependency of the Kingdom of Hungary, obtaining the right to self-government in exchange for help with its fleet and payment of an annual tribute. Ragusa was fortified and equipped with two ports. The Communitas Ragusina began to be called Respublica Ragusina from 1403.

Basing its prosperity on maritime trade, Ragusa became the major power of the southern Adriatic and came to rival the Republic of Venice. For centuries Ragusa was an ally of Ancona, Venice's other rival in the Adriatic. This alliance enabled the two towns on opposite sides of the Adriatic to resist attempts by the Venetians to make the Adriatic a "Venetian bay", which would have given Venice direct or indirect control over all the Adriatic ports. The Venetian trade route went via Germany and Austria; Ancona and Ragusa developed an alternative route going west from Ragusa through Ancona to Florence and finally to Flanders.

Ragusa was the door to the Balkans and the East, a place of commerce in metals, salt, spices and cinnabar. It reached its peak during the 15th and 16th centuries thanks to tax exemptions for affordable goods. Its social structure was rigid, and the lower classes played no part in its government, but it was advanced in other ways: in the 14th century the first pharmacy was opened there, followed by a hospice; in 1418 the trafficking of slaves was abolished.

When the Ottoman Empire advanced into the Balkan Peninsula and Hungary was defeated in the Battle of Mohács in 1526, Ragusa came formally under the supremacy of the sultan. It bound itself to pay him a symbolic annual tribute, a move that allowed it to maintain its effective independence.

The 17th century saw a slow decline of the Republic of Ragusa, due mainly to an earthquake in 1667 which razed much of the city, claiming 5000 victims, including the rector, Simone de Ghetaldi. The city was quickly rebuilt at the expense of the Pope and the kings of France and England, which made it a jewel of 17th-century urbanism, and the Republic enjoyed a short revival. The Treaty of Passarowitz of 1718 gave it full independence but increased the tax to be paid at the gate, set at 12,500 ducats.

The Peace of Pressburg of 1805 assigned the city to France. In 1806, the Republic was occupied by Napoleonic France. The Republic was dissolved by order of General Auguste Marmont on 31 January 1808 and was annexed to the Napoleonic Illyrian provinces. After a general insurrection against the occupation in 1813 and 1814, it was betrayed and occupied by its ally, the Austrian Empire.

Gaeta

As Byzantine influence declined in Southern Italy the town began to grow. For fear of the Saracens, in 840 the inhabitants of the neighbouring Formiæ fled to Gaeta. Though under the suzerainty de jure of Byzantium, Gaeta had then, de facto,  a republican form of government with a dux, as a strong bulwark against Saracen invasion.

The first consul of Gaeta, Constantine, who associated his son Marinus with him, defended the city from the ravages of saracens pirates and fortified it, building outlying castles as well. He was removed in 867, probably violently, by Docibilis I, who established a dynasty.

It was Docibilis II (died 954) who first took the title of dux or duke (933). Docibilis saw Gaeta at its zenith.

Gaeta declined in importance in the late tenth and early eleventh centuries. The Norman overlords of Gaeta appointed dukes from various families of local prominence, Normans mostly, until 1140, when the last Gaetan duke died, leaving the city to the Norman Kingdom of Sicily.

Relationships
Relationships between the maritime republics were governed by their commercial interests, and were often expressed as political or economic agreements aimed at shared profit from a trade route or mutual non-interference. But competition for control of the trade routes to the East and in the Mediterranean sparked rivalries that could not be settled diplomatically, and there were several clashes among the maritime republics.

Pisa and Venice

Towards the end of the 11th century, the First Crusade in the Holy Land began on the initiative of Pope Urban II, supported by the speeches of Peter the Hermit. Venice and Pisa entered the crusade almost simultaneously, and the two republics were soon in competition. The Venetian naval army of bishop Eugenio Contarini clashed with the Pisan army of Archbishop Dagobert in the sea around Rhodes. Pisa and Venice gave support to the Siege of Jerusalem by the army led by Godfrey of Bouillon. The Pisan force remained in the Holy Land. Daibert became the Latin Patriarch of Jerusalem and crowned Godfrey of Bouillon first Christian King of Jerusalem. Venice, in contrast, soon ended its participation in the first crusade, probably because its interests lay mainly in balancing Pisan and Genoese influence in the Orient.

Relationships between Pisa and Venice were not always characterized by rivalry and antagonism. Over the centuries, the two republics signed several agreements concerning their zones of influence and action, to avoid hindering each other. On 13 October 1180 the Doge of Venice and a representative of the Pisan consuls signed an agreement for the reciprocal non-interference in Adriatic and Tyrrhenian affairs, and in 1206 Pisa and Venice concluded a treaty in which they reaffirmed the respective zones of influence. Between 1494 and 1509, during the siege of Pisa by Florence, Venice went to rescue of the Pisans, following a policy of safeguarding Italian territory from foreign intervention.

Venice and Genoa

The relationship between Genoa and Venice was almost continuously competitive and hostile, both economically and militarily. Until the beginning of the 13th century, hostilities were limited to rare acts of piracy and isolated skirmishes. In 1218 Venice and Genoa reached an agreement to end the piracy and to safeguard each other. Genoa was guaranteed the right to trade in the eastern imperial lands, a new and profitable market.

War of Saint Sabas and the conflict of 1293–99

Conflict between the two Republics reached a violent crisis in the struggle at Saint-Jean d'Acre for ownership of the Saint Sabas monastery. The Genoese occupied it in 1255, beginning hostilities with the sacking of the Venetian neighbourhood and the destruction of the ships docked there. Venice first agreed to an alliance with Pisa regarding their common interests in Syria and Palestine, but then counter-attacked, destroying the fortified monastery. The flight of the Genoese and of the baron Philip of Montfort, ruler of the Christian principality of Syria, concluded the first phase of the punitive expedition.

Just one year later, the three maritime powers fought an uneven conflict in the waters facing Saint-Jean d'Acre. Almost all the Genoese galleys were sunk and 1,700 fighters and sailors were killed. The Genoese replied with new alliances. The Nicaean throne was usurped by Michael VIII Palaiologos, that aimed at reconquest of the lands once owned by the Byzantine Empire. His expansionist project suited the Genoese. The Nicaean fleet and army conquered and occupied Constantinople, causing the collapse of the Latin Empire of Constantinople less than sixty years after its creation. Genoa replaced Venice in the monopoly of commerce with the Black Sea territories.

This period of conflict between Genoa and Venice ended with the Battle of Curzola of 1298 (won by Genoa), in which the Venetian admiral Andrea Dandolo was taken prisoner. To avoid the shame of arriving in Genoa in shackles, Dandolo committed suicide by smashing his head against the oar to which he was tied. A year later, the Republics signed a peace treaty in Milan.

War of Chioggia

Towards the end of the 14th century, Cyprus was occupied by the Genoese and ruled by the signoria of Pietro II of Lusignano, while the smaller island of Tenedos, an important port of call on the Bosphorous and Black Sea route, was conceded by Andronikos IV Palaiologos to Genoa in place of the concession of his father John V Palaiologos to Venice. These two events fuelled the resumption of hostilities between the two maritime Republics, which were expanding from the east to the west of the Mediterranean.

The conflict was named the War of Chioggia because the Venetians, after an initial success, were defeated in Pula by the Genoese, who occupied Chioggia and besieged Venice. The Venetians established a new fleet and besieged the Genoese in Chioggia in turn, forcing them to surrender in 1380. The war ended in favour of the Venetians with the Peace of Turin on 8 April 1381.

The capture of Constantinople by the Ottomans of Mehmed II on 29 May 1453 put an end to the eleven centuries of the Byzantine Empire. This event aroused strong feelings that inspired Pope Nicholas V to plan a crusade. To realize his idea, the pope mediated between the two coalitions that were continuing to battle in Tuscany and Lombardy. Cosimo de' Medici and Alfonso V of Aragon entered the Italic League, together with Pope Nicholas, with Francesco Sforza of Milan and with Venice.

While Popes Callistus II and Pius II tried to progress their predecessor's idea and were canvassing the states of the Italic League and other European powers to interest them in a crusade, the Ottomans defeated many Genoese and Venetian colonies. These events showed the superiority of the new great naval and military Ottoman power in the eastern Mediterranean and forced the two Italian maritime republics to seek a new destiny. Genoa found it the growth of international finance, Venice in land expansion.

Land battles and gathering in the Holy League

Around the mid-15th century, Genoa entered into a triple alliance with Florence and Milan, with Charles VII of France as its head. Meanwhile, Venice sided with Alfonso V of Aragon, who occupied the throne of Naples. Due to the rivalry of the Italian States, two great coalitions were formed, and foreign intervention in the peninsula was steadily increasing.

To oppose the Ottomans, Venice and Genoa put aside their differences in the 16th century to join the Holy League created by Pius V.
Most of the Christian fleet consisted of Venetian ships, around 100 galleys. Genoa sailed under the Spanish flag, as the Republic of Genoa lent all its ships to Philip II. The impressive Christian League fleet gathered in the Gulf of Lepanto under the command of the Spaniard John of Austria to clash with the Turkish fleet commanded by Kapudan Ali Pasha. The Battle of Lepanto was fought from midday on 7 October 1571 until the following dawn and ended in victory for the Christian League.

Genoa and Pisa
To begin with, these two maritime republics, close to one another on the Tyrrhenian Sea, collaborated as allies against the threat of Arab expansion. However, their later rivalry dominated the western Mediterranean.

Allied against Arabs

At the beginning of the second millennium, Muslim armies had advanced into Sicily, and were trying to conquer Calabria and Sardinia. To resist them, Pisa and Genoa joined forces to banish the fleet of Mujāhid al-‘Āmirī from the coasts of Sardinia, where it had settled temporarily between 1015 and 1016, threatening the survival of the Sardinian giudicati. Once that was achieved, disputes soon broke out over control of the conquered territories. Due to the limited forces available, the alliance was unable to occupy the large Tyrrhenian island for long.

The many disputes, even the armed ones, were set aside in 1087 when they reunited to fight their common enemy. In the summer of the same year, a massive fleet composed of two hundred galleys from Genoa and Pisa, with some from Gaeta, Salerno and Amalfi, set sail for the Mediterranean coast of Africa. The fleet mounted a successful offensive against Mahdia on 6 August 1087. On 21 April 1092 the Pope elevated the archdiocese of Pisa to the rank of metropolitan archdiocese and placed the bishops of Corsica under its authority.

That same victorious expedition persuaded Pope Urban II that a large crusade to liberate the Holy Land would be possible. Around the 1110s, Pope Paschal II asked Pisans and Genoese to organize a crusade in the western Mediterranean. The expedition was very successful and freed the Balearic Islands from the Muslims. As a sign of gratitude, the pope granted many privileges to the two republics. The Pisan archbishop was granted primacy over Sardinia, in addition to Corsica.

First War between Pisa and Genoa
The papal concessions to the archbishop of Pisa greatly increased the fame of the Tuscan republic throughout the Mediterranean, but at the same time aroused Genoese envy, which soon developed into conflict. In 1119, the Genoese attacked some Pisan galleys, beginning a bloody war on sea and land. It lasted until 1133, interrupted by several truces that were sometimes observed and sometimes violated. The clashes were brought to an end by sharing authority over the Corsican dioceses between the two cities.

Second War
When Emperor Frederick I Barbarossa came to Italy to oppose the power of the Italian cities, Genoa gave its support to the imperial cause, although with slight reservations, while Pisa made its support conditional on the emperor taking part in the siege of Milan. In 1162 and 1163 Frederick I granted Pisa great privileges, such as control of the Tyrrhenian coast as far as Civitavecchia.

This reignited Genoa's resentment and rivalry, which once again developed into open conflict. There was a pause in the conflict on Frederick's fourth descent into Italy, but it resumed soon after his departure. Peace was reached on 6 November 1175 with the return of the Holy Roman Emperor to Italy. The agreement favoured Genoa, expanding its overseas territories. Pisa and Genoa took part in the campaign commanded by Frederick's successor Henry VI against the Kingdom of Sicily.

Defeat of Pisa

From 1282 to 1284 Genoa and Pisa reverted to fighting each other. A decisive naval battle occurred on 6 August 1284. Pisan and Genoese fleets fought the whole day in what became known as the Battle of Meloria. The Genoese emerged victorious, while the Pisan galleys, having received no help, were forced to retreat to the port of Pisa. Prisoners taken by the Genoese were in the order of thousands. Among them was the poet Rustichello da Pisa, who met Marco Polo (captured during the Battle of Curzola) and wrote down the adventures of the Venetian explorer.

The Battle of Meloria greatly reduced the power of the Pisan Republic, which never regained its leading role in the western Mediterranean. Pisa had lost thousands of young men in the battle, causing a population collapse. Venice did not intervene to help its ally Pisa in its crisis. Some historians consider this decision to have been an error on the part of Venice, which yielded supremacy of the Tyrrhenian Sea to rival Genoa and simultaneously lost the precious help of Pisa in the east. Despite the setback, Pisa was able to continue its territorial expansion in Tuscany some decades afterwards, thanks to Guido da Montefeltro and Henry VII, Holy Roman Emperor.

In the 14th century, Pisa changed from a commune to a signoria. Fazio Novello della Gherardesca, an enlightened aristocrat, improved relations with Florence, the Pope and Genoa. The treaty with Genoa was just the first of a series of commercial agreements. But in the first years of the following century, under the rule of Gabriello Maria Visconti, the city of Pisa was besieged by Milan, Florence, Genoa and France. Giovanni Gambacorta took advantage of this to rise to power, but he secretly negotiated surrender with the besiegers. On 6 October 1406 Pisa became a possession of Florence, which thus realized its long-held goal of access to the sea. That was the end of the Pisan Republic.

Amalfi and Pisa
Amalfi had already lost complete autonomy from the second half of the 11th century, although it continued running its commercial routes and enjoying a large degree of administrative autonomy, at least in this period. Under the protection of the Norman William II, third Duke of Apulia, in October 1126 the administrators of Amalfi reached a profitable commercial agreement with the neighbouring Pisa, to collaborate in the protection of their common interests in the Tyrrhenian. This agreement was the outcome of a decades-old friendship with the Tuscan republic.

However, Amalfi had no army of its own to protect its commercial interests. That is why Amalfian ships are not often reported to have been engaged in military action against other maritime republics. In fact it was the Pisan army that broke the pact with Amalfi by attacking the coastal city on 4 August 1135 during the war waged by Pope Innocent II and the new emperor Lothair II, Holy Roman Emperor (aided by the republics of Genoa and Pisa) against the Norman Roger II of Sicily, who controlled Amalfi. That war ended in favour of Roger II, who gained recognition of his rights over the territories of South Italy, but it was a severe blow for Amalfi, which lost both its fleet and its political autonomy.

Venice, Ancona and Ragusa
Commercial competition among Venice, Ancona and Ragusa was very strong because all of them bordered the Adriatic Sea. They fought open battles on more than one occasion. Venice, aware of its major economic and military power, disliked competition from other maritime cities in the Adriatic. Several Adriatic ports were under Venetian rule, but Ancona and Ragusa retained their independence. To avoid succumbing to Venetian rule, these two republics made multiple and lasting alliances.

In 1173 Venice united its forces with Frederick I Barbarossa's imperial army to try to overpower Ancona. Fredrick's intention was to reassert his authority over the Italian cities. The Venetians deployed numerous galleys and the galleon Totus Mundus in the port of Ancona, while imperial troops lay siege from the land: thus began the siege of Ancona in 1173. After some months of dramatic resistance by the Anconitans, supported by Byzantine troops, they were able to send a small contingent to Emilia-Romagna to ask for help. Troops from Ferrara and Bertinoro arrived to save the city and repelled the imperial troops and the Venetians in battle.

Venice conquered Ragusa in 1205 and held it until 1358 when Ragusa regained de facto freedom, paying tributes first to the Hungarians, and after the Battle of Mohács, to the Turks. During this period Ragusa reconfirmed its old alliance with Ancona.

See also
 Italian city-states
 Dalmatian city-states
 List of historic states of Italy
 Outremer
 Hanseatic League
 Thalassocracy
 Regatta of the Historical Marine Republics

Notes

Bibliography
Maritime republics
 Adolf Schaube, Storia del commercio dei popoli latini del Mediterraneo sino alla fine delle Crociate, Unione tipografico-editrice Torinese, 1915
 Armando Lodolini, Le repubbliche del mare, edizioni Biblioteca di storia patria, (Ente per la diffusione e l'educazione storica), Rome 1967
 G. Benvenuti, Le Repubbliche Marinare. Amalfi, Pisa, Genova, Venezia, Newton & Compton editori, Roma 1998.
 Marc'Antonio Bragadin, Storia delle Repubbliche marinare, Odoya, Bologna 2010, 240 pp., .

Duchy of Amalfi
 Umberto Moretti, La prima repubblica marinara d'Italia: Amalfi: con uno studio critico sulla scoperta della bussola nautica, A. Forni, 1998

Republic of Genoa
 Aldo Padovano; Felice Volpe, La grande storia di Genova, Artemisia Progetti Editoriali, 2008, Vol. 2, pp. 84, 91
 Carlo Varese, Storia della repubblica di Genova: dalla sua origine sino al 1814, Tipografia d'Y. Gravier, 1836

Republic of Pisa
 Gino Benvenuti, Storia della Repubblica di Pisa: le quattro stagioni di una meravigliosa avventura, Giardini, 1961

Republic of Venice
 Alvise Zorzi, La repubblica del leone: Storia di Venezia, Bompiani 2002
 Samuele Romanin, Storia documentata di Venezia editore Naratovich 1854

Republic of Ancona
 Various authors, Ancona repubblica marinara, Federico Barbarossa e le Marche; Città di Castello, Arti grafiche, 1972

Republic of Ragusa
 Sergio Anselmi e Antonio Di Vittorio, Ragusa e il Mediterraneo: ruolo e funzioni di una repubblica marinara tra Medioevo ed età Moderna, Cacucci, 1990

 
10th-century establishments in Italy
13th-century disestablishments in Italy
Economic history of Italy
Medieval Croatia
History of the Mediterranean
Maritime history